Daniel M. Kimmel (born 1955) is an American film critic and author.

In September 2014, he became editor of The Jewish Advocate where he served through December 2015. He received a B.A. from the University of Rochester and a degree in law from Boston University.

Kimmel was the Boston correspondent for Variety from 1986 to 2013, and has been a TV columnist for The Boston Herald. From 1984 to 2009, he was a film reviewer for the Telegram & Gazette in Worcester, Massachusetts.  His reviews can be found at NorthShoreMovies.net and the Sci-Fi Movie Page. Until his promotion he was the "Movie Maven" for The Jewish Advocate. His essays on classic science fiction films were being published in The Internet Review of Science Fiction from 2005–2010 and are now in Space and Time.

He is a past president and current member of the Boston Society of Film Critics. In May 2012, he became founding co-chair of the Boston Online Film Critics Association.

Kimmel is the author of several books and has co-written a play The Waldorf Conference about the Hollywood blacklist. His 2004 history of Fox, The Fourth Network, received the Cable Center Award for best book of the year. His collection of essays titled Jar Jar Binks Must Die was nominated for a Hugo Award in the category "Best Related Work". His novel Shh! It's a Secret was on the shortlist for the Compton Crook Award given to best first novel by the Baltimore Science Fiction Society. His latest is Father of the Bride of Frankenstein. He is the 2018 recipient of the Skylark Award given by the New England Science Fiction Association.

Books 
 The Fourth Network: How FOX Broke the Rules and Reinvented Television   
 Love Stories: Hollywood's Most Romantic Movies   
 Isn't It Romantic
 The Dream Team – The Rise and Fall of DreamWorks: Lessons from the New Hollywood
 I'll Have What She's Having: Behind the Scenes of the Great Romantic Comedies
 Jar Jar Binks Must Die ... And Other Observations About Science Fiction Films
 Shh! It's a Secret – A Novel About Aliens, Hollywood, and the Bartender's Guide
 Time on My Hands: My Misadventures in Time Travel
 Father of the Bride of Frankenstein
 Banned in Boston (co-author with Deborah Hand-Cutler)

References

External links
 Daniel M. Kimmel Goodreads author's page
 Daniel M. Kimmel Information   
 Rotten Tomatoes Movie Reviews by Daniel M. Kimmel

1955 births
American film critics
20th-century American dramatists and playwrights
20th-century American Jews
Boston University School of Law alumni
Living people
Writers from Boston
University of Rochester alumni
20th-century American non-fiction writers
21st-century American Jews